The Château de Colombières is a medieval castle built during the 14th century in Colombières, Calvados, Normandy, France.

References

 http://www.chateau-colombieres.fr/index-UK.php

Castles in Calvados (department)